Jamal Bakhshpour (15 September 1944 in Tabriz, Iran – 21 June 2015 in Cologne, Germany) was a contemporary Iranian painter.

Life 
Bakhshpour graduated from Fine Arts Vocational School, Faculty Of Decorative Arts in Tehran in 1967. He was a student of Mohsen Vaziri-Moghaddam He lived and worked in Germany since 1984.

Jamal Bakhshpour died in 2015 at the age of 70 in Cologne, Germany, after years of battling cancer. His grave is in the Melaten cemetery (area 18 (C)).

See also
 List of Iranian painters

References

External links
  
  https://web.archive.org/web/20141020085725/http://www.festiveart.com/artists/bakhshpour
  https://www.nyu.edu/greyart/collection/iranian%20art/i-bakhshpourwebpages/pictures/g1975.537-bakhshpour,-jama.html
  http://www.siingallery.com/?lang=en&m=artist&action=get&oid=5635
  http://www.tavoosonline.com/SelectedArtist/SpecialEn.aspx?src=194&Page=1

Iranian painters
Iranian contemporary art
1944 births
2015 deaths
People from Tabriz